Nishi may refer to:

 Nishi (surname)
 Nishi (actress), Indian actress, a leading lady primarily in Punjabi films and some Hindi films
 Nishi (tribe) in Arunachal Pradesh, India
 Nishi language, a Sino-Tibetan language of India
 Nishi Daak, a cruel ghost; see Ghosts in Bengali culture
 Nishi–Rosen Agreement, 1898 Russo–Japanese agreement over disputed territory in Korea, partially named after Nishi Tokujirō

Locations 
 Nishi, one pronunciation of the Japanese kanji 西, meaning west.  Locations called "Nishi" include:
 Nishi District, Hokkaidō
 Nishi-ku, Fukuoka
 Nishi-ku, Hiroshima
 Nishi-ku, Kobe
 Nishi-ku, Nagoya
 Nishi-ku, Osaka
 Nishi-ku, Sapporo
 Nishi-ku, Yokohama
 One of the Maug Islands

Language and nationality disambiguation pages